The Brethren: Inside the Supreme Court is a 1979 book by Bob Woodward and Scott Armstrong. It gives a "behind-the-scenes" account of the United States Supreme Court during Warren Burger's early years as Chief Justice of the United States. The book covers the years from the 1969 term through the 1975 term. Using Woodward's trademark writing technique involving "off-the-record" sources, the book provides an account of the deliberations leading to some of the court's more controversial decisions from the 1970s. Among the cases with substantial treatment in the book was the decision in United States v. Nixon (1974), where the Supreme Court unanimously ruled that President Richard Nixon was legally obligated to turn over the Watergate tapes. In 1985, upon the death of Associate Justice Potter Stewart, Woodward disclosed that Stewart had been the primary source for The Brethren.

The book begins with the exit of Chief Justice Earl Warren from the U.S. Supreme Court after the U.S. Senate refused to allow President Lyndon Johnson to elevate sitting Associate Justice Abe Fortas to Chief Justice in 1968. Richard Nixon, the then-current president of the United States, selects judge Warren Burger for the court and he is subsequently confirmed. With a more conservative Chief Justice on the bench, Republicans wish to undo many of the liberal decisions that were brought down under the Warren Court. The current divisions in the court place Chief Justice Burger to the right of nearly all existing justices. John Marshall Harlan II comprised the more conservative side of the court, often joined by Byron White, while Justices William Douglas, William Brennan and Thurgood Marshall took up the left. Justice Potter Stewart (the narrator) and Hugo Black remained swing votes.

Throughout the book, many justices come and go over the seven-year period the book covers. 

The book begins following Fortas' May 1969 resignation, which forces the court to hear cases for most of the 1969-70 term with eight justices. Fortas' eventual successor, Harry Blackmun - who later became the author of the famous Roe v. Wade decision which legalized abortion - was not confirmed until late April 1970. He was Nixon's third nominee for the seat following Senate rejections of Clement Haynsworth and G. Harrold Carswell. 

Justices Hugo Black and John Harlan both leave the court in September 1971 (both died before the end of the year) and are replaced by Lewis F. Powell Jr. and William Rehnquist. Douglas, the most powerful liberal on the bench, suffers a stroke on New Year's Eve 1974 and is forced to retire at the end of the book, furthering the decline of the liberal control of the bench, with John Paul Stevens (who later became the leader of the court's liberal bloc) appointed as his successor. Douglas was especially dismayed President Gerald Ford appointed his successor, since Ford led an impeachment inquiry into Douglas as House Minority Leader in 1970. 

The book's sources are highly critical of Burger as Chief Justice, especially in comparison to his predecessor, Warren (whose death in July 1974 is mentioned in the book). Burger is described by other Justices as pompous, devious, and intellectually mediocre. The book is also critical at various points of Douglas, who is portrayed as having gone from one of America's greatest jurists to a "nasty, petulant, prodigal child" who was overly political, and is also occasionally critical of Marshall, another liberal stalwart, for his alleged intellectual laziness and apathy.

The book does frequently lend out praise to other Justices though. Stewart, who was one of the primary sources for the book, is portrayed in a positive light, as is Brennan, the acknowledged leader of the liberal bloc of justices, both for his intelligence as well as his amiable, friendly personality. The book also issued some particular praise for Justices Harlan, Powell, and Rehnquist.

The accuracy of the book’s portrayal of Marshall has been questioned, and it has been characterized by some as racially charged.
The books accuracy was questioned by some of the Justices, particularly Brennan who privately called it a “goddamn shit sheet.”

References

1979 non-fiction books
Books by Bob Woodward
History books about the United States
History of the Supreme Court of the United States
Collaborative non-fiction books